Peth Ammapur is a panchayat village in the southern state of Karnataka, India. Administratively, Peth Ammapur is under Shorapur Taluka of Yadgir District in Karnataka.  The village of Peth Ammapur is 12 km by road west of the town of Shorapur and 13 km by road east of the village of Baichbal. The nearest railhead is in Yadgir.

There are three villages in the gram panchayat: Peth Ammapur, Jalibenchi and Mangloor.

Demographics 
At the 2001 census, the village of Peth Ammapur had 3,680 inhabitants, with 1,842 males and 1,838 females.

Notes

External links 
 

Villages in Yadgir district